John Eric Salvanera Gonzales (born August 7, 1992), professionally known as Jeric Gonzales, is a Filipino actor, singer, and model. He is known as one of the winners of the second season of the reality show, Protégé, a reality based artista search, created by GMA Network. Gonzales became David Pomeranz's opening act for the latter's concert in Manila. Gonzales joined the Ginoong Laguna 2012 and won 2nd Runner Up.

He is known for his leading roles in Magkaagaw and Start-Up PH.

Education and career 
Gonzales was a nursing graduate from Calamba Doctors' College in Parian who has temporarily set aside taking the board exams to pursue a showbiz dream. Born and raised in Barangay Halang and was mentored by the Southern Luzon mentor Gina Alajar. Gonzales was originally a protégé of Alajar but due to a twist of the show, Alajar had to let go one of her protégés and mentor Jolina Magdangal chose Gonzales as her new protégé.

At the end of the competition, Gonzales was announced as the "Ultimate Male Protégé." Gonzales' female counterpart in winning the competition is Thea Tolentino who is also from Calamba.

Gonzales became part of the now defunct Sunday noontime variety show Party Pilipinas with the other top six finalists. Also after winning Protégé, Jeric was signed, with Thea Tolentino, to be part of Teen Gen, a sequel of the teen oriented show of the 1990s, T.G.I.S..

On 2013, Gonzales appeared as a guest in sitcom Pepito Manaloto. Gonzales was also part of the prime time telenovela, Love and Lies.

In 2014, Gonzales became part of the cast of Hustisya and in Nora Aunor's Dementia. The same year, Gonzales became a member of the musical trio 3LOGY with Abel Estanislao and Jak Roberto. Their first song is the revival of Jolina Magdangal's hit Maybe It's You.

In 2022, Gonzales, along with Alden Richards, Bea Alonzo, and Yasmien Kurdi joined the cast of the Philippine adaptation of Korean drama Start-Up, where he played the role of Davidson "Dave" Navarro. he considered it a biggest break in his career.

Filmography

Television series

Anthologies

Various shows

Film

Discography

Awards and nominations

References

External links
 
 https://www.gmanetwork.com/sparkle/artists/jeric_gonzales

1992 births
Living people
21st-century Filipino male actors
Filipino male television actors
Filipino male models
21st-century Filipino male singers
Participants in Philippine reality television series
Reality show winners
Protégé (TV series) participants
GMA Network personalities
GMA Music artists
People from Calamba, Laguna
Male actors from Laguna (province)
Singers from Laguna (province)
Tagalog people